The 2007 London Marathon was the 27th running of the annual marathon race in London, United Kingdom, which took place on Sunday, 22 April. The elite men's race was won by Kenya's Martin Lel in a time of 2:07:41 hours and the women's race was won by China's Zhou Chunxiu in 2:20:38.

In the wheelchair races, Britain's David Weir (1:30:49) and Shelly Woods (1:50:40) won the men's and women's divisions, respectively.

Around 128,000 people applied to enter the race: 50,039 had their applications accepted and 36,396 started the race. A total of 35,667 runners, 24,815 men and 10,852 women, finished the race.

Results

Men

Women

Wheelchair men

Wheelchair women

References

Results
Men's results. Association of Road Racing Statisticians. Retrieved 2020-04-13.
Women's results. Association of Road Racing Statisticians. Retrieved 2020-04-13.

External links

Official website

2008
London Marathon
Marathon
London Marathon